This is a list of Indonesia's national electoral districts in accordance with Law No. 7 of 2017 and Government Regulation in Lieu of Law No.1/2022, and regions included within them.

Members of the People's Representative Council are elected from multi-member electoral districts (/Dapil). In total, there are 84 districts across Indonesia's 38 provinces. Individual districts are named after their provinces and, if the province has multiple districts, assigned a roman numeral indicating its number in the province. The upcoming 2024 general election will use the 84 electoral districts where 580 members of the People's Representative Council would be elected.

All electoral districts are located entirely within one province and includes regencies and cities within their boundaries, without any regency or city being part of multiple districts. Between 3 and 10 representatives are allocated to each district.

West Java and East Java are tied for the province with the most electoral districts, with 11 each, followed by Central Java with 10. 18 of the country's 34 provinces are individual electoral districts, with Bangka Belitung Islands, North Kalimantan, North Maluku, Gorontalo and West Papua being allocated only the minimum of 3 representatives. West Java, being the country's most populous province, received a share of 91 representatives.

Selection of elected representatives in 2024 will follow a Webster/Sainte-Laguë method.

2022 Changes 
Formation of new provinces South Papua, Central Papua, Highland Papua, and Southwest Papua urged the need of representatives representing the provinces. West Papua electoral district split into the West Papua and Southwest Papua electoral districts, while Papua electoral district split into South Papua, Central Papua, Highland Papua, and Papua electoral districts in accordance with Article 243 of the Government Regulation in Lieu of Law No.1/2022.

Nusantara not to be split from the East Kalimantan electoral district in accordance with Article 568A of the Government Regulation in Lieu of Law No.1/2022, so East Kalimantan representatives at People's Representative Council may represent East Kalimantan and Nusantara areas in 2024 general election. Additionally, explanatory clause of the Article 568A of the Government Regulation in Lieu of Law No.1/2022, East Kalimantan Provincial Representative Council, Kutai Kartanegara Regional Representative Council, and North Penajam Paser Regional Representative Council will no longer have jurisdiction and have no representative rights over Nusantara upon the Presidential Decree on Capital Relocation from Jakarta to Nusantara signed. The decree will be issued in 2024.

List
Note: italics indicate a provincial capital.

Sumatra

Aceh I (7 seats)
Regencies: Simeulue, Aceh Singkil, Aceh Selatan, Aceh Tenggara, Aceh Barat, Aceh Besar, Pidie, Aceh Barat Daya, Aceh Jaya, Gayo Lues, Nagan Raya, Pidie Jaya

Cities: Banda Aceh, Sabang, Subulussalam

Aceh II (6 seats)
Regencies: Aceh Timur, Aceh Tengah, Bireuen, Aceh Utara, Aceh Tamiang, Bener Meriah

Cities: Langsa, Lhokseumawe

North Sumatra I (10 seats)
Regencies: Deli Serdang, Serdang Bedagai

Cities: Tebingtinggi, Medan

North Sumatra II (10 seats)
Regencies: Nias, Mandailing Natal, Tapanuli Selatan, Tapanuli Tengah, Tapanuli Utara, Toba Samosir, Labuhan Batu, Nias Selatan, Humbang Hasundutan, Samosir, Labuhan Batu Selatan, Labuhan Batu Utara, Nias Utara, Nias Barat, Padang Lawas Utara, Padang Lawas

Cities: Sibolga, Padangsidempuan, Gunungsitoli

North Sumatra III (10 seats)
Regencies: Asahan, Simalungun, Dairi, Karo, Langkat, Pakpak Bharat, Batubara

Cities: Tanjungbalai, Pematangsiantar, Binjai

West Sumatra I (8 seats)
Regencies: Mentawai Islands, Pesisir Selatan, Solok, Sijunjung, Tanah Datar, Solok Selatan, Dharmasraya

Cities: Padang Panjang, Padang, Solok, Sawahlunto

West Sumatra II (6 seats)
Regencies:Padang Pariaman, Agam, Lima Puluh Kota, Pasaman, Pasaman Barat

Cities: Bukittinggi, Pariaman, Payakumbuh

Riau I (7 seats)
Regencies: Siak, Bengkalis, Kepulauan Meranti, Rokan Hilir, Rokan Hulu

Cities: Pekanbaru, Dumai

Riau II (6 seats)
Regencies: Kuantan Singingi, Indragiri Hulu, Indragiri Hilir, Pelalawan, Kampar

Jambi (8 seats)
All regencies and cities

South Sumatra I (8 seats)
Regencies: Musi Rawas, Musi Banyuasin, Banyuasin

Cities: Palembang, Lubuklinggau

South Sumatra II (9 seats)
Regencies: Ogan Komering Ulu, Ogan Komering Ilir, Muara Enim, Lahat, Ogan Komering Ulu Selatan, Ogan Komering Ulu Timur, Ogan Ilir, Empat Lawang, Penukal Abab Lematang Ilir

Cities: Pagar Alam, Prabumulih

Bengkulu (4 seats)
All regencies and cities

Lampung I (10 seats)
Regencies: Tanggamus, Lampung Selatan, Pesawaran, Pringsewu, Lampung Barat, Pesisir Barat

Cities: Bandar Lampung, Metro

Lampung II (10 seats)
Regencies: Lampung Timur, Lampung Tengah, Lampung Utara, Way Kanan, Tulangbawang, Mesuji, Tulang Bawang Barat

Bangka Belitung Islands (3 seats)
All regencies and cities

Riau Islands (4 seats)
All regencies and cities

Java

Banten I (6 seats)
Regencies: Pandeglang, Lebak

Banten II (6 seats)
Regencies: Serang

Cities: Cilegon, Serang

Banten III (10 seats)
Regencies: Tangerang

Cities: Tangerang, South Tangerang

Jakarta I (6 seats)
Cities: East Jakarta

Jakarta II (7 seats)
Cities: Central Jakarta, South Jakarta, overseas voters

Jakarta III (8 seats)
Regencies: Thousand Islands

Cities: North Jakarta, West Jakarta

West Java I (7 seats)
Cities: Bandung, Cimahi

West Java II (10 seats)
Regencies: Bandung, West Bandung

West Java III (9 seats)
Regencies: Cianjur

Cities: Bogor

West Java IV (6 seats)
Regencies: Sukabumi

Cities: Sukabumi

West Java V (9 seats)
Regencies: Bogor

West Java VI (6 seats)
Cities: Bekasi, Depok

West Java VII (10 seats)
Regencies: Bekasi, Karawang, Purwakarta

West Java VIII (9 seats)
Regencies: Cirebon, Indramayu

Cities: Cirebon

West Java IX (8 seats)
Regencies: Subang, Sumedang, Majalengka

West Java X (7 seats)
Regencies: Ciamis, Kuningan, Pangandaran

Cities: Banjar

West Java XI (10 seats)
Regencies: Garut, Tasikmalaya

Cities: Tasikmalaya

Central Java I (8 seats)
Regencies: Semarang, Kendal

Cities: Semarang, Salatiga

Central Java II (7 seats)
Regencies: Kudus, Demak, Jepara

Central Java III (9 seats)
Regencies: Grobogan, Blora, Rembang, Pati

Central Java IV (7 seats)
Regencies: Wonogiri, Karanganyar, Sragen

Central Java V (8 seats)
Regencies: Boyolali, Klaten, Sukoharjo

Cities: Surakarta

Central Java VI (8 seats)
Regencies: Purworejo, Wonosobo, Magelang, Temanggung

Cities: Magelang

Central Java VII (7 seats)
Regencies: Purbalingga, Banjarnegara, Kebumen

Central Java VIII (8 seats)
Regencies: Cilacap, Banyumas

Central Java IX (8 seats)
Regencies: Brebes, Tegal

Cities: Tegal

Central Java X (7 seats)
Regencies: Batang, Pekalongan, Pemalang

Cities: Pekalongan

Yogyakarta S.R. (8 seats)
All cities and regencies

East Java I (10 seats)
Regencies: Sidoarjo

Cities: Surabaya

East Java II (7 seats)
Regencies: Probolinggo, Pasuruan

Cities: Probolinggo, Pasuruan

East Java III (7 seats)
Regencies: Banyuwangi, Bondowoso, Situbondo

East Java IV (8 seats)
Regencies: Lumajang, Jember

East Java V (8 seats)
Regencies: Malang

Cities: Batu, Malang

East Java VI (9 seats)
Regencies: Blitar, Kediri, Tulungagung

Cities: Blitar, Kediri

East Java VII (8 seats)
Regencies: Pacitan, Ponorogo, Trenggalek, Magetan, Ngawi

East Java VIII (10 seats)
Regencies: Mojokerto, Jombang, Nganjuk, Madiun

Cities: Madiun, Mojokerto

East Java IX (6 seats)
Regencies: Bojonegoro, Tuban

East Java X (6 seats)
Regencies: Gresik, Lamongan

East Java XI (8 seats)
Regencies: Bangkalan, Pamekasan, Sampang, Sumenep

Lesser Sunda Islands

Bali (9 seats)
All regencies and cities

West Nusa Tenggara I (3 seats)
Regencies: West Sumbawa, Sumbawa, Dompu, Bima

Cities: Bima

West Nusa Tenggara II (8 seats)
Regencies: West Lombok, North Lombok, East Lombok, Central Lombok

Cities: Mataram

East Nusa Tenggara I (6 seats)
Regencies: Alor, Lembata, Flores Timur, Sikka, Ende, Ngada, Manggarai, Manggarai Barat, Nagekeo, Manggarai Timur

East Nusa Tenggara II (7 seats)
Regencies: Sumba Barat, Sumba Timur, Kupang, Timor Tengah Selatan, Timor Tengah Utara, Belu, Malaka, Rote Ndao, Sumba Tengah, Sumba Barat Daya, Sabu Raijua

Cities: Kupang

Kalimantan

West Kalimantan I (8 seats)
Regencies: Sambas, Bengkayang, Landak, Pontianak, Ketapang, Kayong Utara, Kubu Raya

Cities: Pontianak, Singkawang

West Kalimantan II (4 seats)
Regencies: Sanggau, Sintang, Kapuas Hulu, Sekadau, Melawi

Central Kalimantan (6 seats)
All regencies and cities

South Kalimantan I (6 seats)
Regencies: Banjar, Barito Kuala, Tapin, Hulu Sungai Selatan, Hulu Sungai Tengah, Hulu Sungai Utara, Tabalong, Balangan

South Kalimantan II (5 seats)
Regencies: Tanah Laut, Kota Baru, Tanah Bumbu

Cities: Banjarmasin, Banjarbaru

East Kalimantan (8 seats) 
All regencies and cities

North Kalimantan (3 seats)
All regencies and cities

Sulawesi

South Sulawesi I (8 seats)
Regencies: Bantaeng, Jeneponto, Takalar, Gowa, Selayar Islands

Cities: Makassar

South Sulawesi II (9 seats)
Regencies: Bulukumba, Sinjai, Maros, Pangkajene and Islands, Barru, Bone, Soppeng, Wajo

Cities: Parepare

South Sulawesi III (7 seats)
Regencies: Sidenreng Rappang, Pinrang, Enrekang, Luwu, Tana Toraja, Luwu Utara, Luwu Timur, Toraja Utara

Cities: Palopo

West Sulawesi (4 seats)
All regencies and cities

Southeast Sulawesi (6 seats)
All regencies and cities

Central Sulawesi (7 seats)
All regencies and cities

Gorontalo (3 seats)
All regencies and cities

North Sulawesi (6 seats)
All regencies and cities

Maluku and Papua

Maluku (4 seats)
All regencies and cities

North Maluku (3 seats)
All regencies and cities

West Papua (3 seats)
All regencies and cities

Papua (3 seats)
Regencies: Yapen Islands, Biak Numfor, Sarmi, Keerom, Waropen, Supiori, Mamberamo Raya, Jayapura Regency

Cities: Jayapura

South Papua (3 seats)
Regencies: Boven Digoel, Mappi, Asmat

Cities: Merauke

Central Papua (3 seats)
Regencies: Puncak Jaya, Paniai, Mimika, Puncak, Dogiyai, Intan Jaya, Deiyai, Nabire Regency

Cities: Nabire

Highland Papua (3 seats)
Regencies: Jayawijaya, Pegunungan Bintang, Yahukimo, Tolikara, Mamberamo Tengah, Yalimo, Lanny Jaya, Nduga

Cities: Wamena

West Papua (3 seats)
Regencies: Fakfak, Teluk Bintuni, Teluk Wondama, Kaimana, South Manokwari, Pegunungan Arfak

Cities: Manokwari

Southwest Papua (3 seats)
Regencies: Sorong Regency, South Sorong, Raja Ampat, Tambrauw, Maybrat

Cities: Sorong

Source: Law No. 7/2017 and Government Regulation in Lieu of Law No. 1/2022.

References

 
Indonesia
Electoral districts